The Gradient Bright is a Czech single-place, paraglider designed and produced by Gradient sro of Prague. Originally produced in the mid-2000s, it was still in production in 2016 as the Bright 5.

Design and development
The Bright was designed as a beginner and flight training glider. The manufacturer says that the "Bright5 is the best school glider Gradient has ever built." The models are each named for their approximate wing area in square metres.

Operational history
Reviewer Noel Bertrand singled out the Bright in a 2003 review as deserving of "praise for its excellent performance at low speeds".

Variants
Bright 24
Small-sized model for lighter pilots. The glider model is DHV 1 certified.
Bright 26
Mid-sized model for medium-weight pilots. The glider model is DHV 1 certified.
Bright 28
Large-sized model for heavier pilots. The glider model is DHV 1 certified.
Bright 30
Extra large-sized model for much heavier pilots. The glider model is DHV 1 certified.
Bright 4 22
Extra small-sized model for very light pilots. The glider model is EN/LTF A certified.
Bright 4 24
Small-sized model for lighter pilots. The glider model is EN/LTF A certified.
Bright 4 26
Mid-sized model for medium-weight pilots. The glider model is EN/LTF A certified.
Bright 4 28
Large-sized model for heavier pilots. The glider model is EN/LTF A certified.
Bright 4 30
Extra large-sized model for much heavier pilots. The glider model is EN/LTF A certified.
Bright 5 22
Extra small-sized model for very light pilots. The glider model is EN/LTF A certified.
Bright 5 24
Small-sized model for lighter pilots. The glider model is EN/LTF A certified.
Bright 5 26
Mid-sized model for medium-weight pilots. The glider model is EN/LTF A certified.
Bright 5 28
Large-sized model for heavier pilots. The glider model is EN/LTF A certified.
Bright 5 30
Extra large-sized model for much heavier pilots. The glider model is EN/LTF A certified.

Specifications (Bright 26)

References

External links

Bright
Paragliders